Bradwell is a village and civil parish in the English county of Norfolk. The village is immediately to the west of, and largely indistinguishable from, the built-up urban area of the town of Great Yarmouth.

History
Bradwell's name derives from the Anglo-Saxon words for a broad stream.

Bradwell's Church of St. Nicholas is one of the 185 surviving English Round-tower churches, built before the Norman Conquest.

Bradwell is not featured in the Domesday Book.

Geography
The civil parish has an area of 9.74 km2 and in the 2001 census had a population of 10,318 in 4,347 households. The population taken at the 2011 Census was 10,528.

Schools 
Bradwell's' schools include: Hillside Primary School, Homefield Church of England Primary and Nursery School, Lynn Grove High, and Woodlands Primary and Nursery School.

Parish Council and Local Government
For the purposes of local government, the parish today falls within the district of Great Yarmouth. However prior to the Local Government Act 1972, the parish was within Lothingland Rural District in Suffolk.

Bradwell Parish Council has responsibility for a number of amenities within the village, and will make representations to the Borough Council, County Council, Police and others to secure improvements to services within the village.
Its ‘base’ is the Leo Coles Pavilion, located on the Green Lane Playing Field site – its meetings take place there, and the clerk's office is situated there.
The council publishes a twice-yearly newspaper, ‘the Bradwellian’, which is delivered to every household in Bradwell by a team of volunteers.

War Memorial
Bradwell's War Memorial is an Obelisk located on Church Walk. It bears the following names for the First World War and the Russian Civil War:
 Major Percy Wiltshire (1872-1917), 251st (Siege) Battery, Royal Field Artillery
 Stoker-First Class Herbert J. Adams (1897-1919), HMS L55
 Lance-Corporal Walter J. C. Moore (1895-1917), 1/5th Battalion, Royal Norfolk Regiment
 Driver Ernest W. Shorten (1885-1919), Royal Army Service Corps
 Private Harry Delph (1888-1915), 1st Battalion, Essex Regiment
 Private Harry C. Breeze (1881-1918), 34th Battalion, London Regiment
 Private Alec V. Ellis (1897-1918), 1/5th Battalion, Royal Norfolk Regiment
 Private Frederick W. Chaplin (1886-1919), The Queen's Royal Surrey Regiment
 Private Frederick C. Amis (1893-1918), 3rd Battalion, Royal Sussex Regiment
 Sapper Roland J. Tubby (1897-1916), 4th (Provisional) Company, Royal Engineers
 Deckhand Alfred C. Howes (1889-1916), HM Drifter Hillary II
 Deckhand Robert J. Willis (1890-1915), H.M. Drifter Masterpiece
 Deckhand George I. Bessey (1895-1917), HM Trawler Evadine Hull
 Deckhand Henry S. Parfitt (1882-1917), H.M. Trawler Jay
 Arthur W. Bailey (1885-1918), H.M. Trawler Reserve

And, the following for the Second World War:
 Flight-Lieutenant Roger Cook (1920-1944), No. 168 Squadron RAF
 Lieutenant Michael H. C. Bellamy (1924-1944), 2nd Battalion, King's Shropshire Light Infantry
 Sergeant William D. Palmer (1885-1942), No. 408 Squadron, RCAF
 Sergeant Roy C. Bailey (1926-1945), Royal Air Force
 Able-Seaman John H. Cooper (1886-1943), HMS Pembroke (Shore Installation)
 Lance-Corporal Robert A. Brown (1920-1940), 2nd Battalion, Royal Norfolk Regiment
 Guardsman Charles H. J. Marler (1920-1944), 3rd Battalion, Irish Guards
 Gunner Herbert W. Tubby (1922-1943), 4th (Maritime) Regiment, Royal Artillery
 Gunner Charles A. Mace (1916-1940), 4th Regiment, Royal Horse Artillery
 Stoker R. William Eagle (1899-1942), H.M. Trawler Northern Princess
 Trooper Christopher J. O. Ball (1910-1942), Royal Armoured Corps
 Mr Roland R. George of the East Dudgeon Lightship

Notable Residents
Mervyn King- professional Darts player.

References

External links
 St Nicholas Church, Bradwell
 St Nicholas on the European Round Tower Churches Website

.

Villages in Norfolk
Civil parishes in Norfolk
Populated coastal places in Norfolk
Tourism in the United Kingdom
Borough of Great Yarmouth